The following events occurred in June 1924:

June 1, 1924 (Sunday)

Austrian Chancellor Ignaz Seipel was shot by a disgruntled worker. A bullet was extracted from his lung and he survived.
The June Revolution began in Albania as an army of 6,000 nationalists marched on Tirana.
Raymond Poincaré resigned as Prime Minister of France.
The Bengal Provincial Congress Committee passed a resolution acknowledging the sacrifice of Gopinath Saha. It stated that 'this conference, while denouncing and dissociating itself from violence and adhering to the principle of non-violence, appreciates Gopinath Saha's idea of self-sacrifice, misguided though it is, in respect of the country's best interest and expresses respect for such self-sacrifice.' Mahatma Gandhi opposed the resolution.
Born: William Sloane Coffin, Christian clergyman; in New York City (d. 2006)

June 2, 1924 (Monday)
U.S. President Calvin Coolidge signed the Revenue Act into law, despite his many criticisms of the bill. "A correction of its defects may be left to the next session of Congress", Coolidge stated. "I trust a bill less political and more economic may be passed at that time."
The Frank Lloyd-directed film The Sea Hawk premiered at the Astor Theatre in New York City.
Miners in the Ruhr ended their strike after accepting a 6 percent wage increase.
Born: June Callwood, Canadian journalist, writer and activist; in Chatham, Ontario (d. 2007)

June 3, 1924 (Tuesday)
In Albania, fighting was reported in Shkodër and Vlorë, while an Italian destroyer arrived at the port of Durrës. It was thought that Italy may intervene in the June Revolution if any Italian interests in Albania were threatened.
Born: Herk Harvey, film director, actor and producer, in Windsor, Colorado (d. 1996); Ted Mallie, announcer, in Brooklyn, New York (d. 1999); Torsten Wiesel, neurophysiologist and recipient of the Nobel Prize in Physiology or Medicine, in Uppsala, Sweden (alive in 2021)
Died: Franz Kafka, 40, Austro-Hungarian-born author, died of starvation due to complications from laryngeal tuberculosis.

June 4, 1924 (Wednesday)
Anti-government forces in Albania took Shkodër.
The E.M. Forster novel A Passage to India was published.
Born: Dennis Weaver, American TV and film actor; in Joplin, Missouri (d. 2006)

June 5, 1924 (Thursday)
Nathan Leopold and Richard Loeb were indicted on 11 counts of murder and 16 counts of kidnapping arising from the death of Bobby Franks.
Born: Art Donovan, American football player; in The Bronx, New York (d. 2013)

June 6, 1924 (Friday)
The Reichstag approved the Dawes Plan by a 247–183 vote.
Belva Gaertner was acquitted of murder in Chicago; her story partially inspired the play Chicago. 
Cyril Walker of England won the U.S. Open golf tournament.

June 7, 1924 (Saturday)
The United States enacted the Clarke–McNary Act.
Born: Dolores Gray, American actress and singer; in Chicago (d. 2002)

June 8, 1924 (Sunday)

Frédéric François-Marsal formed a cabinet as the new Prime Minister of France, but would serve for only seven days before his government collapsed.
The aviators attempting to be the first to fly around the world reached Hong Kong.

June 9, 1924 (Monday)
Uruguay won gold at the Olympic football tournament with a 3–0 win over Switzerland.
1. F.C. Nuremberg beat Hamburger SV, 2 to 0, to win the German football championship.
Born: Ed Farhat, U.S. professional wrestler known as "The Sheik"; in Lansing, Michigan (d. 2003)

June 10, 1924 (Tuesday)
Giacomo Matteotti, an Italian socialist member of parliament and one of Benito Mussolini's most outspoken critics, was kidnapped in broad daylight. On May 30, he had spoken out against Mussolini and the Fascist movement in general. His fate would be a mystery until his body was found in August, with signs that he had been beaten to death. 
The June Revolution was completed in Albania when anti-government forces took Tirana.
The Republican National Convention opened in Cleveland, Ohio.

June 11, 1924 (Wednesday)
Comedian and actor Frank Tinney was held to the grand jury on $25,000 bail over the assault charge brought by Imogene Wilson. Tinney denied ever striking her and made jokes on the witness stand despite admonitions from the bench.
Died: Théodore Dubois, 86, French composer and music teacher

June 12, 1924 (Thursday)
Charles G. Dawes was announced as Calvin Coolidge's running mate as the Republican National Convention ended.
A few minutes later, four rescuers were killed when the fire caused gunpowder in another cannon to explode.

Born: George H. W. Bush, 41st President of the United States; in Milton, Massachusetts (d. 2018)

June 13, 1924 (Friday)
Gaston Doumergue became the 13th President of France.
Benito Mussolini said he would order summary justice for the guilty if the kidnappers of Giacomo Matteotti were ever identified. Six men had already been arrested for the crime, including Amerigo Dumini.

June 14, 1924 (Saturday)
Aldo Finzi resigned as Italy's Under Secretary of State over the Matteotti disappearance, explaining he was doing so in order to defend himself from "libelous accusations" spread against him by the opposition.
Born: James W. Black, pharmacologist, in Uddingston, Scotland (d. 2010)

June 15, 1924 (Sunday)

Édouard Herriot became Prime Minister of France.
The International Football Association Board legalized a direct goal from a corner kick for the next season.
Born: Ezer Weizman, President of Israel from 1993 to 2000; in Tel Aviv (d. 2005)
Died: Bill Brennan, 30, American boxer, was shot and killed outside the tavern that he owned in New York City, after ejecting two mobsters out of his establishment.

June 16, 1924 (Monday)
King Victor Emmanuel III of Italy held an extraordinary council with former Prime Ministers and members of the royal family to discuss the Matteotti crisis as Mussolini's hold on power appeared increasingly tenuous.
Italian Fascist politician Cesare Rossi surrendered to police after going into hiding for several days for being wanted in connection with the Matteotti disappearance.
The airmen trying to make the first round-the-world flight arrived in Saigon.
The much-delayed trial of Mabel Normand's chauffeur, over the New Year's Day shooting of millionaire Courtland S. Dines, opened in Los Angeles. Edna Purviance once again testified that she was out of the room when the shooting happened.

June 17, 1924 (Tuesday)
The South African general election was held. The government of Jan Smuts was defeated as the National Party led by J. B. M. Hertzog won a plurality of seats.
Rome's Chief of Police, Emilio De Bono, was the latest Fascist to resign in the Matteotti crisis.
Born: Charlotte Armstrong, baseball player with the AAGPBL; in Dallas, Texas (d. 2008)

June 18, 1924 (Wednesday)
The United Kingdom broke off its relations with Mexico over the treatment of diplomatic agent H.C. Cummins. 
It was reported that Amerigo Dumini had confessed to the Matteotti kidnapping.
Denmark formally recognized the Soviet Union.
Born: George Mikan, American basketball star; in Joliet, Illinois (d. 2005)

June 19, 1924 (Thursday)
A postal strike began in Canada.
Fascist leader Giovanni Marinelli was arrested in connection with the Matteotti kidnapping.
Mabel Normand's chauffeur was acquitted on the assault charge from the New Year's Day shooting, though he was immediately re-arrested on a separate liquor charge. Despite the acquittal, the scandal was too much for Normand's film career after the William Desmond Taylor murder and she was effectively finished as a Hollywood star.

June 20, 1924 (Friday)
Sir Francis Younghusband of the Royal Geographical Society sent a telegram informing the media that George Mallory and A.C. Irvine had died attempting to climb Mount Everest.
The airmen trying to make the first aerial circumnavigation of the globe flew from Bangkok to Rangoon. 
Born: Chet Atkins, guitarist and record producer; in Luttrell, Tennessee (d. 2001)

June 21, 1924 (Saturday)
The Grand National Assembly of Turkey passed the Surname Act, requiring every Turkish citizen to have a surname.
Born: Ezzatolah Entezami, actor, in Tehran, Iran (d. 2018)

June 22, 1924 (Sunday)
Britain and France agreed to hold a conference in London starting in mid-July to discuss implementation of the Dawes Plan.
Murder suspect Fritz Haarmann was arrested in Hanover, Germany after he was seen stalking boys at the Central Station. A search of his apartment turned up bloodstains and possessions of victims as one of the most notorious serial killers in German history was revealed.

June 23, 1924 (Monday)
Russell Maughan successfully made the first dawn-to-dusk transcontinental flight across the United States. It was his third attempt.

June 24, 1924 (Tuesday)
The Democratic National Convention opened at Madison Square Garden in New York City. William Gibbs McAdoo was considered the front-runner going into the convention.
The Italian Senate held a ceremony commemorating Giacomo Matteotti, now presumed dead. Benito Mussolini promised to reform his government and then put it to a vote of confidence the last week of July, but said that the Fascists did not need to be removed from power over the crisis.
The New York Daily Mirror was first published.
Born: Brian Bevan, Australian rugby league footballer; in Sydney (d. 1991)

June 25, 1924 (Wednesday)
Frank B. Kellogg was appointed as the U.S. delegate for next month's London conference.
Born: Sidney Lumet, director, producer and screenwriter, in Philadelphia, Pennsylvania (d. 2011)

June 26, 1924 (Thursday)
Jesse Barnes of the Boston Braves opposed Virgil Barnes of the New York Giants in the first brother vs. brother pitching matchup in major league baseball history. Jesse took the loss and Virgil a no-decision as the Giants won, 8 to 1.
The United States and Bulgaria exchanged ratifications of an extradition treaty.
The round-the-world flyers reached Calcutta, India.

June 27, 1924 (Friday)
The Italian opposition gave Benito Mussolini an ultimatum demanding a recognition of ministerial responsibility for fascist crimes, a complete and thorough investigation of the Matteotti affair and the abolition of the Blackshirts. If the government did not accede, the ultimatum read, the opposition would stage a boycott of parliament.
Ten minutes of silence were observed all over Italy in respect for Giacomo Matteotti.
American golfer Walter Hagen won the British Open.
Born: Bob Appleyard, English cricketer (d. 2015)

June 28, 1924 (Saturday)
The Lorain–Sandusky tornado killed at least 85 people in Ohio.
At the Democratic National Convention, a plank calling for participation in the League of Nations was soundly rejected by a margin of 742 ½ to 353  ½. A plank denouncing the Ku Klux Klan by name was also narrowly rejected.

June 29, 1924 (Sunday)
Canada's postal strike ended.
Studded leather collars were reported as the latest fad in women's fashion in Paris.
Born: 
Ezra Laderman, composer, in Brooklyn
Flo Sandon's (stage name for Mammola Sandon), Italian singer; in Vicenza, Italy (d. 2006)

June 30, 1924 (Monday)
J. B. M. Hertzog became 3rd Prime Minister of South Africa.
The Democratic National Convention adjourned at midnight with William Gibbs McAdoo and Al Smith deadlocked in balloting.
Sixteen-year-old Calvin Coolidge, Jr. played a tennis match on the White House tennis court wearing tennis shoes but no socks. During the course of the match he developed a toe blister that would lead to fatal blood poisoning.
Dutch-Jewish poet Jacob Israël de Haan assassinated in Jerusalem by the Haganah for his anti-Zionist activity.

References

1924
1924-06
1924-06